The Huntoon Mountains are a mountain range in Mineral County, Nevada.

References 

Mountain ranges of Nevada
Mountain ranges of Mineral County, Nevada